Bill Mackey (December 15, 1927 – July 29, 1951) was an American racecar driver.  His name at birth was William Christopher Gretsinger, Jr.

Mackey was killed while attempting to qualify for an AAA sprint car race at Funk's Speedway in Winchester, Indiana on July 29, 1951, a day which became known as "Black Sunday".

Indianapolis 500 results

World Championship career summary
The Indianapolis 500 was part of the FIA World Championshipfrom 1950 through 1960. Drivers competing at Indy during those years were credited with World Championship points and participation. Bill Mackey participated in 1 World Championship race but scored no World Championship points.

References

External links

1927 births
1951 deaths
Racing drivers from Dayton, Ohio
Indianapolis 500 drivers
AAA Championship Car drivers
Racing drivers who died while racing
Sports deaths in Indiana